Jin Bo-ra (born January 12, 1987), known professionally as Sunday, is a South Korean singer and musical actress. She debuted in 2004 as a soloist in Japan with the release of two digital singles before eventually joined as a member of South Korean girl group The Grace in 2005. As of 2010, the group's activities was halted and she maintain her career as a musical actress.

Career

Sunday began her career as a soloist in Japan with her debut digital single, "リラの片想い" (Rira no Kataomoi), on July 10, 2004. She released her second and last Japanese single, "ウソツキBOY" (Usotsuki Boy) on April 20, 2005.

Sunday became a member of the South Korean girl group The Grace in 2005. The group officially debuted on April 29, 2005, in China and May 1, 2005, in South Korea. As of 2010, The Grace has been on an indefinite hiatus.

In July 2011, Sunday and fellow The Grace member Dana formed the subgroup The Grace Dana & Sunday, releasing "One More Chance" (나 좀 봐줘) on July 11.  Their debut performance was on July 8 on KBS Music Bank. The duo released soundtrack "Now You" (지금 그대) for the drama Hooray for Love (애정만만세) on September 23. The duo also participated in eighth winter compilation album from SM Town 2011 Winter SMTown – The Warmest Gift. The two performed the song "Amazing" physically released on December 13, following released song for "With Coffee Project Part 1" on December 20.

After a five-year hiatus from music, Sunday returned with the digital single "Still", a collaboration with DickPunks' Kim Tae-hyun, on November 11, 2016, as a part of SM Entertainment's project SM Station.

On January 20, 2021, it was reported that Sunday's exclusive contract with the agency had come to an end in May of the previous year. Soon after, SM Entertainment confirmed the news and stated, "Our exclusive contract with Sunday has come to an end. We will continue to cheer on her future activities."

Discography

Soundtrack appearances and solo songs

Filmography

Television series

Musical theatre

References

External links

 

1987 births
Living people
K-pop singers
South Korean women pop singers
South Korean female idols
South Korean contemporary R&B singers
South Korean musical theatre actresses
South Korean dance musicians
South Korean television personalities
SM Entertainment artists
Chung-Ang University alumni